Arkansas Sports Hall of Fame is the hall of fame and museum for sports in Arkansas, United States. The hall of fame inducted its first class in 1959. The hall's museum is located on the west end of the Verizon Arena in North Little Rock, Arkansas.

The Hall showcases men, women and teams from a variety of sports ranging from football to fishing and includes inductees from each of the 75 counties in Arkansas.

List of inductees 

Other inductees include:
 Leon Campbell
 George Cole
 Walt Coleman
 Ben Cowins
 Todd Day
 Quinn Grovey
 Ray Hamilton
 Ed Hamm
 John Hoffman
 Cliff Lee
 Haeng Ung Lee
 Lee Mayberry
 Leslie O'Neal
 Ulysses Reed
 Jack Robbins
 Brooks Robinson
 Billy Ray Smith, Sr.
 Barry Switzer
 R. C. Thielemann
 Scotty Thurman
 Corliss Williamson
Ron Calcagni

External links 

 

All-sports halls of fame
Museums in Pulaski County, Arkansas
Halls of fame in Arkansas
State sports halls of fame in the United States
Sports museums in Arkansas
Sports organizations established in 1959
Buildings and structures in North Little Rock, Arkansas
Awards established in 1959